The Delaware Thunder are a professional ice hockey team based in Harrington, Delaware. The team is a member of the Federal Prospects Hockey League and plays at the Centre Ice Rink. The Thunder are the first professional sports team to play in Harrington.

History
The Delaware Thunder were announced as a member of the Federal Prospects Hockey League on May 29, 2019. The Thunder are owned by Delaware Pro Hockey LLC, an investment group led by Charlie Pens, who also serves as the president and general manager of the team. Former Danville Dasher Ryan Marker was the first signing in team history. They play out of the Centre Ice Rink on the Delaware State Fairgrounds. To accommodate the team's arrival, the rink's seating capacity was expanded to approximately 700 for the 2019–20 season.

In the 2022-23 Season, the Delaware Thunder went on a professional hockey record 28-game losing streak ranging from November 5 to February 11th when the Thunder beat the Elmira Mammoth 5-2. The Thunder broke the streak previously held by the Battle Creek Rumble Bees which was 24 games.

References

External links
 Delaware Thunder

Harrington, Delaware
Federal Prospects Hockey League teams
Ice hockey clubs established in 2019
2019 establishments in Delaware
Ice hockey teams in Delaware